Garhi Abdulla Khan is a village situated in Thana Bhawan Block of Shamli district. i.e. a Tehsil in Uttar Pradesh, India.

It is located about 50 km kilometres from the Mandal Saharanpur and 32 km from district headquarter Shamli. It is located on Thanabhawan Road. This village is famous for Ramlila. All communities of this village are living peacefully on the outskirts of this village. A temple is situated of Lord Shiva known as Shivalaya, in the village.

It is an ancient village there are three major religious ancient monuments: An ancient temple Shivalaya dedicated to Lord Shiva, and Jain Temple of British Period dedicated to Lord Mahaveer Swami. There is the first Navagraha Temple of District Shamli known as Shani Dev Dham. It is located on Titron Road. There is a two km belt of Mango trees towards the Titron Road.

Major Schools And Colleges in the area: Prakash memorial public school affiliates to UP Board, Chaudhary Dhiraj Singh Intermediate College affiliated to UP Board Allahabad. SDS Public School affiliated to CBSE New Delhi. It is now a small town but it is under Gram Panchayat.

Nearest Airport: IGI Airport New Delhi (130  km)
Nearest Railway Station: Thanabhawan Town (12  km)- Rural
Nearest Major Railway Station: Shamli(32 km), Saharanpur(45 km), Karnal (46 km), Muzaffarnagar (45 km)

References 
 http://www.maplandia.com/india/uttar-pradesh/saharanpur/garhi-abdulla-khan/

Villages in Shamli district